Procambarus milleri, the Miami cave crayfish is a species of crayfish in the family Cambaridae. It is endemic to Florida, where it is known from 14–15 sites in Dade County, Florida, and is listed as an endangered species on the IUCN Red List.

An aquarium strain has been selectively bred to achieve a orange colour. It is the only stygobiotic crayfish known to breed in captivity.

Gallery

References

Cambaridae
Endemic fauna of Florida
Freshwater crustaceans of North America
Cave crayfish
Taxonomy articles created by Polbot
Crustaceans described in 1971
Taxa named by Horton H. Hobbs Jr.